Britto School is a school in Adambakkam, Chennai, India.

History 
The school was started by the Holy Trinity Trust, and was originally named the Mount Public School.  The principal was Malathi Joel, a non-resident Indian who had previously returned to India to start a school.  Joel died in 2010.

The school later changed its name to the Mount Christian Matriculation Higher Secondary School, and achieved numerous awards in basketball.  There are three buildings in the school, as well as a playground and a basketball court.

The school was taken over by Britto's Institution and renamed Britto School.

Schools in Chennai